Tanzil (Arabic تنزيل) "sending down", Inzal (Arabic انزال) "bringing down", and nuzul (Arabic نزول) "descending", and other words based on the triconsonantal Arabic root verb nazala (Arabic نزل ) "to descend", refer to the Islamic belief in the descent of God's message from heaven to earth where it was revealed to the Prophet of Islam, Muhammad.

In the Quran — where the revealed Islamic message was compiled for human use — forms of these words are found in verse Q 17:105:  
"And with the truth We have sent it [i.e., the Qur’ān] down, and with the truth it has descended." (Arabic: وَبِالْحَقِّ أَنْزَلْنَاهُ وَبِالْحَقِّ نَزَلَ  wa-bi-l-ẖaqqi `anzalnahu wa-bi-l-ẖaqqi nazal).

Process
The Quran refers to its original source as the “mother of the book” (umm al-kitab) which is located in the presence of Allah (God). The Quran itself also calls this a “well-guarded tablet” (lawh mahfuz) a “concealed book” (kitab maknun). It describes the revelation to Muhammad as being dictated by the angel Jabril, not by Allah himself, and Muhammad as a messenger of Allah.   While the Quran descends, in the Quran Allah himself is never described as coming down, but is sometimes mentioned in hadith as going from higher to lower heavens.

It is thought that the basic units of revelation of the Quran were short passages or verses (ayat). Later these ayat were arranged into surahs under (Muslims believe) divine guidance.

In a hadith tradition from Abd Allah ibn Abbas, it is said that the Quran descended in two stages.  The first descent (or Tanazzul) was to the Luh Al-Mahfuz (Preserved Scripturum) or to 'al-sama’ al-dunya (the ‘lowest heaven’) and happened in some  early, unspecified time.
In the second stage, it descended from al-sama’ al-dunya to the worldly realm to be revealed to Muhammad by Gabriel piecemeal in stages (mufarriqan or tafsilan) over 23 years until the whole Quran was completely revealed. 
Muhammad's first encounter with the archangel produced the first five verses of the ninety-sixth chapter of the present Quran, the chapter of The Clot (Surat al-‘Alaq)

One quranic verse replies to those who ask why the Quran was revealed over time and not all at once:  

Some commentators believe that the Quran was revealed to Muhammad twice. In addition to the gradual 23 year revelation until his death, there was an 'immediate revelation' that happened on the Laylat al-Qadr. This is based on an understanding of sura Al-Qadr:1 as referring to descent of the Quran in its entirety.  `Abd Allah ibn `Abbas reports that, "… descended in Ramadan, on the Laylat al-Qadr in one lay down (jumlah, Ar. جملة), …"

Asbab al-nuzul

According to hadith, the circumstances that verses were sent down in, and the study of why and how a particular verses was revealed is  known as Asbab al-nuzul (‘occasions of revelation’). Abu al-Hassan Ali bin Ahmad al-Wahidi an-Naisaburi (d. 1075), has been called the father of the field of asbab al-nuzul, he argued that understanding the reasons/circumstances for a given revelation was crucial to resolve apparent inconsistencies in the Quran.

According to the scholar al-Suyuti who wrote a book on Asbab al-nuzul, revelations came down for two basic reasons: 
"divine initiative", i.e. because God decided to send and reveal something. Examples being the first revelation to Muhammad at Hira’, or the ayat calling for the Fast of Ramadan
To address some situation "directly and immediately", or to respond and answer a question someone had raised. An example being the sura ‘The Spoils’ (al-Anfal) that came down concerning the situations in the aftermath of the Battle of Badr.

According to a number of scholars the asbab (occasion) of revelation can only properly be determined through "direct transmission from those who actually witnessed the event of revelation" (Abu al-Hassan Ali bin Ahmad al-Wahidi an-Naisaburi), and cannot be left to independent reasoning (ijtihad), nor legal consensus (ijma‘) (al-Zarkashi).  which means in effect hadith reports coming from the canons of hadith or available in works of Islamic historiography, or works of tafsir. Unfortunately "very frequently" ahadith on asbab contradict each other and this "calls into question the reliability of the asbab
genre".

See also
Wahy

References

Citations

Books, articles, etc.
 

 
 

Islamic texts
Quran
Sufi philosophy
Islamic eschatology
Islamic terminology
Revelation